Carl Anton von Meyer (in Russian: Карл Анто́нович фон Ме́йер, Karl Antonovich von Meyer) (1 April 1795 – 24 February 1855) was a German, Russified botanist and explorer.

Meyer was born in Vitebsk. He received his education at the University of Dorpat (1813-14) as a student of Karl Friedrich von Ledebour, with whom he later embarked on a scientific journey to the Crimea (1818). In 1826, with Ledebour and Alexander G. von Bunge, he took part in an expedition to the Altay Mountains and the Kirghiz Steppe (Kazakhstan). Plants collected on the trip formed the basis of "Flora Altaica" (four volumes issued between 1829 and 1833).

In 1835 he began work as a botanist for the Academy of Sciences in St. Petersburg, where he conducted research with Friedrich Ernst Ludwig von Fischer. In 1844 he succeeded Carl Bernhard von Trinius as director of the academy's botanical museum, and in 1850 replaced Fischer as head of the imperial botanical garden. Meyer was the only botanist to have held both positions, being in charge of the garden and museum simultaneously until his death in Saint Petersburg in 1855.

Publications 
Among his written works were treatises on the plant families Cruciferae and Polygonaceae. The following are a few of his principal works:
 Enumeratio plantarum novarum a cl. Schrenk lectarum (with Friedrich Ernst Ludwig von Fischer), 1841–1842.
 Flora Altaica; scripsit Carolus Fridericus a Ledebour, adiutoribus Car. Ant. Meyer et Al. a Bunge. (with Karl Friedrich von Ledebour and Alexander Georg von Bunge), 1829–1833.
 Versuch einer Monographie der Gattung Ephedra: durch Abbildungen erläutert, 1846.

See also
:Category:Taxa named by Carl Anton von Meyer

References 

19th-century botanists from the Russian Empire
German taxonomists
1795 births
1855 deaths
German explorers
Explorers from the Russian Empire
Russian people of German descent
19th-century explorers
19th-century German botanists